Brian Andrew Chambers (born 1 April 1965) is an Australian born English cricketer.  Chambers was a right-handed batsman who bowled left-arm fast-medium.  He was born in Melbourne, Victoria.

Chambers represented the Sussex Cricket Board in a single List A match against Hertfordshire in the 1999 NatWest Trophy.  In his only List A match, he scored 4 runs and took a single catch in the field, while taking a single wicket with figures of 1/30.

References

External links
Brian Chambers at Cricinfo

1965 births
Living people
Cricketers from Melbourne
English cricketers
Sussex Cricket Board cricketers
Australian emigrants to England
English cricketers of 1969 to 2000